Yann Dedet (born 25 January 1946) is a French film editor and actor.

Dedet has been working in film editing since the early 1970s. He often worked for film directors François Truffaut, Maurice Pialat and Nicole Garcia. His work includes more than 80 film and television productions. In 2012, Dedet was awarded the César Award for Best Editing with his co-editor Laure Gardette for the 2011 film Polisse. Before that, he had been nominated twice times. As an actor, he was only seen in small roles.

Filmography

As director 
2002

Le Pays du chien qui chante

As editor:

2019

 Happy Birthday

2018

 Keep Going

2017

 Elementary

2016

 After Love
 In The Forest

2015

 Being 14
 The Sense of Wonders

2014

 La Braconne
 Valentin Valentin

2013

 Casa Nostra
 For Those Who Can Tell No Tales
 Jealousy
 Sense of Humor

2012

 Mauvaise fille

2011

 A Burning Hot Summer
 Poliss

2010

 It Begins With the End
 No Trepassing
 Robert Mitchum est mort

2009

 Regrets

2008

 Frontier of Dawn
 The Other One

2006

 Dans les cordes
 Lady Chatterley

2005

 Free Zone

2004

 Red Lights

2000

 Come Undone

Publication 
Le Point de vue du lapin. Le roman de « Passe Montagne », P.O.L., 2017

References

External links 
 Yann Dedet on IMDb
 Yann Dedet on Cineuropa

1946 births
20th-century French male actors
French male film actors
French film directors
Living people